Paul Goddard is an Australian character actor.

Early life
Goddard was born in Sydney, New South Wales, Australia.

Roles 
Goddard has played Agent Brown in the film The Matrix and Stark in the science fiction television series Farscape, after having auditioned for the role of Scorpius.  He has appeared in such other films as The Everlasting Secret Family, Babe, and Mighty Morphin Power Rangers: The Movie, as well as the television series Sons and Daughters, The Lost World and All Saints.

Goddard has worked as an acting coach on the Australian reality television show Australia's Next Top Model.

References

External links

English male film actors
English male television actors
Australian male film actors
Australian male television actors
English emigrants to Australia
Living people
Male actors from Berkshire
actors from Reading, Berkshire
20th-century English male actors
20th-century Australian male actors
21st-century Australian male actors
21st-century English male actors
Year of birth missing (living people)